This article is a list of announcers for CBS coverage of the National Football League (NFL).

Current

Play-by-play
 Andrew Catalon: play-by-play (2013–present)
 Spero Dedes: play-by-play (2010–present)
 Ian Eagle: play-by-play (1998–present)
 Kevin Harlan: play-by-play (1998–present)
 Tom McCarthy: play-by-play (2014–present)
 Beth Mowins: play-by-play (2017–present)
 Jim Nantz: studio host (1998–2003); play-by-play (1988–1993); lead play-by-play (2004–present)
 Noah Eagle: Nickelodeon play-by-play (2021-present)

Studio host
 James Brown: studio host (2006–present)
 Nate Burleson: studio analyst (2017–present); fill-in studio host (2020-present); Nickelodeon analyst (2021-present)

Studio analysts
 Bill Cowher: studio analyst (2007–present)
 Boomer Esiason: studio analyst (2002–present)
 Jonathan Jones: insider (2022–present)
 Nate Burleson: studio analyst (2017–present); fill-in studio host (2020-present); Nickelodeon analyst (2021-present)
 Phil Simms: lead analyst (1998–2016), studio analyst (2017–present)

Game analysts
 Adam Archuleta: analyst (2014–present)
 Iain Armitage: Nickelodeon rules analyst (2021-present)
 Tiki Barber: analyst (2019–present)
 Nate Burleson: Nickelodeon analyst (2021-present)
 Jay Feely: special teams analyst (2015-present), regular analyst (2017–present)
 Charles Davis: analyst (2020–present)
 Gabrielle Nevaeh Green: Nickelodeon analyst (2021-present)
 Trent Green: analyst (2014–present)
 James Lofton: analyst (2017–present)
 Tony Romo: lead analyst (2017–present)
 Gene Steratore: rules analyst (2018–present)

Sideline reporters
 Evan Washburn: sideline reporter (2014–present), #2 sideline reporter (2015-present)
 Tracy Wolfson: lead sideline reporter (2013–present), feature reporter (2013–present)
 Melanie Collins: sideline reporter (2017–present), #3 sideline reporter (2018-present)
 Amanda Balionis: sideline reporter (2018-present)
 Sherree Burruss: sideline reporter (2020-present)
 AJ Ross: sideline reporter (2018-present), #4 sideline reporter
 “Young” Dylan Gilmer: Nickelodeon reporter (2022-present)
 Jamie Erdahl: sideline reporter (2014–2017, 2022-present) select assignments
 Michael Grady: sideline reporter (2022-present)
 Aditi Kinkhabwala: sideline reporter (2022-present)

2022 Pairings
 Jim Nantz/Tony Romo/Tracy Wolfson
 Ian Eagle/Charles Davis/Evan Washburn
 Kevin Harlan/Trent Green/Melanie Collins
 Greg Gumbel/Adam Archuleta/AJ Ross
 Andrew Catalon or Beth Mowins (week 4)/James Lofton/rotating sideline reporter
 Spero Dedes/Jay Feely/Aditi Kinkhabwala 
 Tom McCarthy (weeks 1–2) or Andrew Catalon (week 4)/Tiki Barber

Former

A

Marv Albert: play-by-play (1975–1978, 2011–2013)
George Allen: analyst (1978–1982)
Marcus Allen: studio analyst (1998), feature reporter (1998–2004)
Brian Anderson: play-by-play (2014–2016)
Bruce Arians: analyst (2018)
Jill Arrington: sideline reporter (2000–2002)

B
Richard Baldinger: analyst (2004–2006)
Gary Bender: play-by-play (1975–1981; 1986)
Bonnie Bernstein: sideline reporter (1999–2005); feature reporter (1998, 2004–2005)
Joe Boland: play-by-play (1957–1959)
Craig Bolerjack: play-by-play (1998–2005)
Emerson Boozer: analyst (1977)
Terry Bradshaw: studio analyst (1990–1993); analyst (1984–1989) (1980–1981) 
Tim Brando: play-by-play (1999–2003)
Tim Brant: play-by-play (1987–1990)
Terry Brennan (1960–1961)
Tom Brookshier: analyst (1962) (1966–1980); play-by-play (1981–1986)
Jim Brown: analyst (1977–1978)
Timmy Brown: analyst (1973)
Jack Buck: play-by-play (1964–1974, 1982–1987)
Steve Beuerlein: analyst (2004–2018)
Nick Buoniconti: analyst (1976–1978)
Dick Butkus: studio analyst (1988–1989)
Dennis Byrd: analyst (1993)

C
Joe Campanella (1966)
Tony Canadeo: analyst (1959–1967)
Charlsie Cantey: studio analyst (1983)
Charley Casserly: insider (2006–2012)
Paul Christman:(1958–1959) (1968–1970)  
Frank Clarke (1969–1973) 
Ken Coleman (1958)    (1962–1965)
George Connor (1958–1968) (1971–1972)
Bob Costas: play-by-play (1977–1979)
Don Criqui: play-by-play (1967–1978; 1998–2012)
Irv Cross: studio analyst (1975–1989); game analyst (1971–1991)
Randy Cross: studio analyst (1999–2001; game analyst (1989–1993, 2002–2012)

D
Stacey Dales: sideline reporter (2015–2016)
Jenny Dell: sideline reporter (2014, 2016, 2021)
Dan Dierdorf: analyst (1985–1986, 1999–2013)
Mike Ditka: studio analyst (2000–2002)
John Dockery  (1982–1985)
Jack Drees  (1959–1973)
Fred Dryer: analyst (1981)

E
Pete Elliott (1967)
Mike Emrick  (1992–1993)
Dick Enberg: play-by-play (2000–2009)

F
Gary Fencik  (1988)
Bob Fouts  (1959-1960, 1962-1967)
Dan Fouts: analyst (1988–1993, 2008–2019)

G
Roman Gabriel  (1978–1979)
Eddie Gallaher  (1958–1964)
Rich Gannon (2005–2020)
Phyllis George: studio analyst (1975–1977, 1980–1984)
Jim Gibbons  (1956–1957, 1959–1967)
Frank Gifford: analyst (1964–1970)
Jerry Glanville: studio analyst (1999–2001); analyst (2003)
Frank Glieber: play-by-play (1962–1975)  (1977–1984)
Tony Gonzalez: studio analyst (2014–2016)
Curt Gowdy: play-by-play (1979–1980)
Sonny Grandelius  (1965–1967)
Red Grange: play-by-play (1957)  (1959–1963)
Jim Gray: reporter (1988–1993)
Joe Greene: analyst (1982)
 Greg Gumbel: studio host (1990–1993, 2004–2005); play-by-play (1988–1989, 2006–2022); lead play-by-play (1998–2003)

H
Pat Haden: analyst (1986) (1988–1989)
Mal Hammack (1967)
Wayne Hardin (1965)
Tom Harmon (1957–1958) (1961) 
Alex Hawkins (1971–1972) (1975–1977)    
Jim Henderson (1990)
Jim Hill  (1981)  (1983–1986) (1993) 
Paul Hornung: analyst (1975–1979)

J
Craig James: studio analyst (1999–2000), game analyst (2001–2002)
Dan Jiggetts: analyst  (1985–1990)  (1993)
Gus Johnson: play-by-play (1998–2010)
Daryl Johnston: analyst (2000)
Brent Jones: studio analyst (1998); analyst (1999–2005)
Sonny Jurgensen: analyst (1975–1980)

K
Bob Kelley  (1957–1959)   (1961–1964)
Dan Kelly  (1973–1974) 
Jim Kelly   (1982–1984)
Jayne Kennedy: studio analyst (1978–1980)
Armen Keteyian: #1 sideline reporter (1998–2003), #2 sideline reporter (2004–2005)
Jerry Kramer  (1969)

L
Jason La Canfora: insider (2012–2021)
Warren Lahr (1962–1967)
Jim Lampley: play-by-play (1987)
Eddie LeBaron (1966–1971)
Lee Leonard (1974)
Johnny Lujack (1957–1961)
Lex Lumpkin: Nickelodeon reporter (2021)
Verne Lundquist: play-by-play (1984–1993; 1998–2000)

M
Bill Macatee: play-by-play (1999–2013)
John Madden: analyst (1979–1993)
Charles Mann (1999–2000)
Dan Marino: studio analyst (2002–2013)
Tommy Mason (1973)
Trevor Matich (2001)
Tom Matte (1976–1978)
Bill Mazer  (1970–1971) (1978)  
Mark May: analyst (1998–2000)
Sean McDonough: play-by-play (1991, 1993)
Will McDonough (1986–1989)
Jim McKay (1957)
Bill McPeak (1966)
Al Michaels (1975–1976)
Matt Millen: analyst (1992–1993)
Lenny Moore (1968)
Johnny Morris (1975–1986)
Jim Morse (1963–1966, 1972)
Brent Musburger: studio host (1975–1989); play-by-play (1973–1974)
Jim Mutscheller (1967)

N
Stu Nahan  (1966–1967)
Lindsey Nelson  (1966–1981)
Brad Nessler: play-by-play (1990–1991)

O
Pat O'Brien: feature reporter  (1983)    (1989–1993)
Merlin Olsen: analyst (1990–1991)

P
Van Patrick  (1957–1967)
Don Paul  (1965–1967)
Drew Pearson  (1984)
Lowell Perry  (1966)
Bosh Pritchard  (1962–1963)

R
Beasley Reece: analyst (1998–1999; 2003); sideline reporter (2000–2002)
Pete Retzlaff (1973–1974)
John Robinson: analyst (1991–1992) 
Bruce Roberts, studio host 1966–1973
Sam Ryan: feature reporter 2006-2010: Super Bowl XLI sideline reporter
Tim Ryan: play-by-play (1972) (1977–1980) (1982–1993)

S
Gil Santos
 Deion Sanders studio analyst (2001–2004, 2014–2017) (Thursday Night Football only)
Johnny Sauer: analyst (1963–1974)
Chris Schenkel
Bart Scott: studio analyst (2014-2016)
Hal Scott
Ray Scott: play-by-play (1956–1973)
Vin Scully: play-by-play (1975–1981)
George Seifert: studio analyst (1998)
Brad Sham play-by-play (2004)
Shannon Sharpe: studio analyst (2004–2014)
Jim Simpson
Jimmy "The Greek" Snyder: studio analyst (1976–1987)
Gordy Soltau
Ken Stabler: analyst (1987–1989)
George Starke 
Bart Starr: analyst (1973-1974)
Roger Staubach: analyst (1980–1982)
Dick Stockton: play-by-play (1978–1993)
Hank Stram: analyst (1975, 1978–1993)
Gil Stratton
Pat Summerall: analyst (1963–1964, 1966–1974); play-by-play (1974–1993)

T
Michele Tafoya: sideline reporter (1998)
Steve Tasker: analyst (1998-2018)
Jim Thacker: play-by-play (1977–1978)
Joe Theismann: analyst (1986–1987)
Ed Thilenius: play-by-play (1966–1967)
Chuck Thompson: play-by-play (1956–1959, 1962–1969)
Spencer Tillman: analyst (2000–2003)
Clayton Tonnemaker: analyst (1961–1966)
Joe Tucker: play-by-play (1956–1959, 1962–1967)
Roger Twibell (1977–1978)

U
Johnny Unitas: analyst (1974–1977)

V
Norm Van Brocklin: analyst (1967)
Dick Vermeil: analyst (1983–1987)
Billy Vessels (1964)
Lesley Visser: color and sideline reporter (1989–1993, 2000-present)

W
Wayne Walker: analyst (1973–1977, 1982–1986)
Charlie Waters: analyst (1983)
Jack Whitaker: play-by-play (1960–1964, 1968–1973)
Solomon Wilcots: analyst (2001–2016), postseason sideline reporter (2006–2012)

Z
Steve Zabriskie: play-by-play (1988–1989)

References

See also
National Football League on television

CBS announcers
NFL on CBS announcers